Love in the City may refer to:

Love in the City (1953 film), Italian production
Boy & Girl, a 2003 Chinese TV series also known as Love in the City in some countries
Love in the City (2007 film),a Hong Kong production film
Love in the City (2014 TV series), American reality genre production, see 2014 in American television